Bernard Ayitey Mensah Jnr (born 29 December 1994) is an English footballer who plays as a striker for Redditch United.

Club career

Watford
Mensah was named in April 2011 as one of a group of seven young players who would take up a two-year scholarship with Watford at the start of the 2011–12 season. In July 2011, Mensah signed a professional contract that would activate on his 17th birthday and keep him at the club until the end of the 2013–14 season. Later on that year, Mensah had surgery on his knee, ruling him out of playing contention for the remainder of the season.

In January 2013, Mensah signed an extension to his contract, committing to Watford until 2016. He scored 14 goals in 19 appearances for the under-18 side during the 2012–13 season before becoming a full professional at the end of the campaign.

On 23 November 2013, Mensah made his Watford debut as a 78th-minute substitute for Javier Acuña against Bolton Wanderers.

On 10 January 2014, Mensah joined Conference side Braintree Town on a one-month loan. Due to bad weather which limited his playing time, Mensah's loan was extended for a further month until 16 March. Mensah again extended his loan at Braintree Town, this time until the end of the season on 11 March 2014.

On 6 November 2014, Mensah joined Barnet on loan until 5 January 2015.

Mensah re-joined Braintree on loan on 11 February 2015 until the end of the 2014–15 season.

On 3 June 2016, it was announced that Mensah would leave Watford upon his contract expiry.

Aldershot Town
On 10 June 2016, Mensah joined National League side Aldershot Town on a one-year deal, which was renewed at the end of the season until June 2018

Bristol Rovers
On 11 January 2018, Mensah joined League one side Bristol Rovers for an undisclosed fee. He made his first appearance for the club as an 80th-minute substitute in their 3–1 win against Bradford City on 20 January 2018. After loan spells at Lincoln City and a return to Aldershot in the 2018–19 season, Mensah joined Maidenhead United on a season-long loan in July 2019.

Gloucester City
In January 2020, Mensah's loan spell with Maidenhead was terminated early and he joined Gloucester City permanently on an 18-month contract for an undisclosed fee. On 2 February 2021, Mensah signed a new contract with the National League North leaders that would keep him at the club until 2023.

On 12 February 2022, Mensah joined Redditch United on a one-month loan deal. At the end of the 2021–22 season, Mensah was placed on the transfer list having been told he would not be part of manager Lee Mansell's plans for the following season.

Redditch United
On 1 July 2022, Mensah returned to Redditch United.

International career

Mensah is eligible to play for Ghana or England but has yet to represent either country at any level.

In 2011, Mensah trained with the Ghana squad ahead of their friendly against Nigeria at Vicarage Road. However, he was not called up by Ghana and was asked to join the squad for training due to their depleted squad.

Career statistics

References

External links

Profile at watfordfc.com

1994 births
Living people
English footballers
English sportspeople of Ghanaian descent
Association football forwards
Watford F.C. players
Braintree Town F.C. players
Barnet F.C. players
Aldershot Town F.C. players
Bristol Rovers F.C. players
Lincoln City F.C. players
Maidenhead United F.C. players
Gloucester City A.F.C. players
Redditch United F.C. players
English Football League players
National League (English football) players
Southern Football League players
Black British sportsmen
Footballers from the London Borough of Hounslow